Life's Little Miracles (or Little Miracles) follows the stories of children at Toronto's Hospital for Sick Children. It originally aired on Canadian broadcasters Slice Network and CBC Television.

References

External links
Life's Little Miracles on Slice Network's website
Little Miracles on CBC's website
Little Miracles on co-producer Breakthrough Entertainment's website
Little Miracles on IMDb

1990s Canadian reality television series
CBC Television original programming
Slice (TV channel) original programming
Television series by Alliance Atlantis